The 2021–22 Bangladesh Women's Football League, also known as the Bashundhara Group Bangladesh Women's Football League 2021–22 due to sponsorship reason. It was the 5th season of the Bangladesh Women's Football League, the top level of women's football in Bangladesh, since its establishment in 2011. The league was commenced on 15 November 2022 and ended on 31 December 2022.

Bashundhara Kings Women won the current 2021–22 season title.

Venue
All matches were played at the BSSS Mostafa Kamal Stadium in Dhaka, Bangladesh

Teams

Clubs and locations 
The Bangladesh Football Federation (BFF) have confirmed the following twelve participants will contest the league.

Personnel and sponsoring

League table

Results

Positions by round

Results by games

Season statistics

Goalscorers

Own goals 
† Bold Club indicates winner of the match

Hat-tricks 

n  Player scored n goals.

See also 
2021–22 Bangladesh Premier League
2022 AFC Women's Club Championship

References 

2022 in Bangladeshi women's sport
2022 in Bangladeshi football
2023 in Bangladeshi football
Bangladesh Women's Football League seasons
2022–23 in Asian association football leagues
Women's football in Bangladesh
2022–23 domestic women's association football leagues